Christopher Nwankwo (born 30 September 1941) is a Nigerian Senator, representing the Ebonyi North Senatorial District of Ebonyi State. He was elected Senator in the 2011 elections, running on the People's Democratic Party ticket.

Early life and education
Nwankwo received his Higher School Certificate from the Holy Family College in 1960 and his Bachelor of Arts degree from the University of Nigeria, Nsukka, in 1965.

Senatorial career
There was violence preceding the Ebonyi North elections in 2011 between PDP supporters and All Nigeria People's Party supporters. Christopher Nwanko won the general election.

Nwankwo was reportedly upset about a roads initiative that was behind schedule and endangering motorists.

References

Living people
University of Nigeria alumni
Peoples Democratic Party members of the Senate (Nigeria)
1941 births